The Salem and Penns Grove Traction Company owned a line from Salem to Penns Grove, New Jersey, connecting the ends of two branches of the Pennsylvania Railroad (later Pennsylvania-Reading Seashore Lines). The company was chartered in 1915, and W. W. Hepburn was the first president.  Streetcars were discontinued in 1933, and were replaced by buses that had run since 1930, now New Jersey Transit route 468 (Penns Grove-Salem-Woodstown).

See also
List of New Jersey street railroads

References

External links
NJ Transit Route 468 schedule (PDF)

New Jersey streetcar lines
Defunct New Jersey railroads
Interurban railways in New Jersey
American companies established in 1915
Railway companies established in 1915